The women's foil was one of ten fencing events on the fencing at the 2000 Summer Olympics programme. It was the sixteenth appearance of the event. The competition was held on 21 September 2000. 40 fencers from 21 nations competed.

Draw

Finals

Section 1

Section 2

Section 3

Section 4

Results

References

External links
 Report of the 2000 Sydney Summer Olympics

Foil women
2000 in women's fencing
Women's events at the 2000 Summer Olympics